G. Gopakumar  is an Indian leading political scientist and psephologist. He was former Vice Chancellor of Central University of Kerala,.

Career
Professor at Kerala University for over fifteen years.  
Dean of Social Sciences and Professor and HoD of Political Science, University of Kerala 
Vice-chairman, Academic Committee, Credit and Semester System, University of Kerala 
Co-ordinator, UGC Special Assistance Programme, Department of Political Science, University of Kerala.
Director General of the Institute of Parliamentary Affairs, Government of Kerala
Director, V.K. Krishna Menon Study Centre for International Relations
Director, Nehru Study Centre, 
UGC-Emeritus Fellow, 
ICSSR Senior Fellow,

Fellowships and awards
Visiting Research Fellow, University of New South Wales, Australia (2010) 
Prince of Songkla University, Thailand (2010)
Australian Studies Senior Fellow (2009)
Visiting Fellow, Shastri Indo-Canadian Fellowship (2000 & 2006) 
Visiting Faculty, Claremont Graduate University, USA (2003)
Fulbright Award, USA (1998 & 2002)
Salzburg Fellow, Austria (1998)
Visiting Faculty, University of Calgary, Canada (2001)
International Visiting Fellow in USA (1996) 
UGC-Indo-French Cultural Exchange Award (1990) 
UGC-Research Scientist (1988-1989)

International projects
University of Pennsylvania, Center for the Advanced Study of India (CASI), Coalition Politics in India 
Claremont Graduate University (CGU) in California and the University of Kerala (Kerala) Partnership

Select publications
Books
Civil Society- Politics Interface: The Kerala Experience, Manak Publishers, New Delhi, 2013 
Globalization and the Plight of the Marginalized Sections in Kerala: The Case of Chengara Land Struggle, Department of Political Science, University of Kerala, 2010 
Gulf Return Migration and Dilemmas of Rehabilitation, Icon Publishers, New Delhi, 2008 
Regional Political Parties and State Politics, Deep and Deep Publications, New Delhi, 1986 
The Congress Party and State Politics, Deep and Deep Publications, New Delhi, 1984

Edited Books
Foreign Policy, Federalism and International Treaties (ed.), New Century Publications, New Delhi, 2011. 
Towards an Inclusive India: Role of Parliament in Social Change (ed.), Manak Publishers, New Delhi, 2011	 
Nehru and Modern India: Anatomy of Nation Building (ed.), New Century Publications, New Delhi, 2010 
Future of Parliamentary Democracy in India (ed.), Icon Publishers, New Delhi, 2007 
Iraq War and New World Order (ed.), Icon Publishers, New Delhi, 2005

Contribution
Gopa Kumar specializes in the areas of International Relations, Comparative Politics and Indian Politics. He had published 12 books and over 145 research articles and successfully guided 27 PhD candidates. He is also a popular TV panelist in Kerala and is known for objective and scientific political analysis.

Media coverage
NAAC accredits B++ grade to Central University of Kerala 
NAAC team completes Central varsity visit 
Future of U.S. linked to the U.S. presidential outcome, Prof (Dr.) G Gopa Kumar
‘Better Indo-UAE cultural ties needed’
Kerala Central varsity in development mode
Tuber Crops Day 2016, The Central Tuber Crops Research Institute (CTCRI)
Value Based Education: Dr Gopakumar
Right Turn Ahead
Kerala stands apart, again
Nehru and Nation Building in India, Seminar Presentation
All you want to know about Fulbright Fellowships

References

Living people
Academic staff of the University of Kerala
Year of birth missing (living people)